Xavier Avila Bonastre (born 10 December 1973) is a Spanish former professional tennis player.

Born in the Catalan city of Lleida, Avila made his only ATP Tour main draw appearance at the 1993 Torneo Godó in Barcelona. A wildcard in the singles draw, he lost his first round match to Juan Albert Viloca in three sets.

In 1995 he represented Spain at the Universiade in Fukuoka and won a bronze medal for doubles.

Avila played collegiate tennis for the University of Kansas, earning singles All-American honors in 1997.

References

External links
 
 

1973 births
Living people
Spanish male tennis players
Kansas Jayhawks athletes
College men's tennis players in the United States
Medalists at the 1995 Summer Universiade
Universiade bronze medalists for Spain
Universiade medalists in tennis
Sportspeople from Lleida
20th-century Spanish people